The Fiji Warriors, also referred to as Fiji A, is a national representative rugby team of rugby union in Fiji. It is the second-tier side to the Fiji national team. The Warriors team is selected from players in the Fijian domestic competitions and competes in the World Rugby Pacific Challenge against Samoa A and Tonga A. Since 2016, the Fiji Warriors team has played in the Americas Pacific Challenge against national A teams from North and South America.

History
Fiji's national A team has made several tours to South America, the earliest being in 2003 where they defeated  by  24–3 in Montevideo. But the history of the second national team can be traced back almost half a century earlier to 1955 when a Fiji XV side undertook a two-week tour of Samoa and was undefeated in all three matches played.

The Fiji Warriors first played in the Pacific Rugby Cup in 2006, but the team was one of two Fijian sides in the competition for the first five years – the other being the Fiji Barbarians – and so it was not considered to be Fiji A for that period.

In 2010, Fiji A played two matches against  in the first Punjas Series. The team had one win and one loss but claimed the series on aggregate scores. This result was repeated in the second (and concluding) Punjas Series in 2011.

The Pacific Rugby Cup was reorganised in 2011, with Fiji Warriors becoming the sole Fijian representative in the PRC, which has  since been mainly contested by national 'A' teams. From 2011 onward the Fiji Warriors team has effectively been Fiji A.

In 2012, the Fiji A team toured to Ireland where they suffered one of their heaviest defeats, beaten 53–0 at Limerick by the
.

At the 2015 World Rugby Pacific Challenge, the Fiji Warriors were the runner-up, with wins over Junior Japan and Samoa A and two defeats against the Argentine Pampas XV. In May 2015, the Fiji Warriors made a South American tour to play Uruguay and an Argentina XV, winning all three matches.
In 2016, it played World Rugby Pacific Challenge and also World Rugby Americas Pacific Challenge.

Squads

2011

Waisea Daveta*
Viliame Veikoso*
Setefano Somoca*
Sekonaia Kalou*
Tevita Cavubati**
Aca Ratuva**
Jimilai Naikadawa**
Anare Koliavu
Nemia Kenatale*
Taniela Rawaqa**
Isoa Neivua**
Ravai Fatiaki*
Jo Naisilisili**
Campese Ma'afu*
Navi Bolatagici
Penijamini Makutu**
Apisalome Ratuniyarawa
Rupeni Nasiga*
Timoci Vakadranu
Samu Bola**
Waisale Vatuvoka
Jonetani Ralulu**
Jona Tuitoga
Paula Tiko
Adriu Delai**
Paula Karatu.

Notes
 * denotes players who were in the Fiji 2011 RWC squad.
 ** denotes players who have played for Fiji in a Test.
 *** denotes players who have played 7s for Fiji in the IRB Series.

2015
Fiji Warriors 28-man squad for the uncapped June matches against Uruguay and Pampas XV, acting as 2015 Rugby World Cup warm-ups for all three nations. The team will be coached by Senirusi Seruvakula, who will work closely with the national head coach John McKee.

Warriors Head Coach:  Senirusi Seruvakula
 Caps Updated: 15 May 2015

Record

Honours
Pacific Challenge (formerly the Pacific Rugby Cup)
 Champion: (9) 2009, 2010, 2011, 2012, 2013, 2016, 2017, 2018, 2019.
 Runner-up: (4) 2006, 2014, 2015, 2020.

Americas Pacific Challenge
 Runner-up: (1) 2016

Season standings

Pacific Challenge
{| class="wikitable" style="text-align:center;"
|- border=1 cellpadding=5 cellspacing=0
! style="width:20px;"|Year
! style="width:20px;"|Pos
! style="width:20px;"|Pld
! style="width:20px;"|W
! style="width:20px;"|D
! style="width:20px;"|L
! style="width:20px;"|F
! style="width:20px;"|A
! style="width:35px;"|+/-
! style="width:20px;"|TB
! style="width:20px;"|LB
! style="width:20px;"|Pts
! style="width:50px;"|Final
! align=left|Notes 
|-
|align=left|2020
|2nd
| 3 || 2 || 0 || 1 || 88 || 26 ||  +62 || 2 || 0 ||10
| — ||align=left| Runner-up on league table (no final)
|-
|align=left|2019
|1st
| 3 || 3 || 0 || 0 ||170 || 54 || +116 || 3 || 0 ||15
| — ||align=left| Title winner on league table (no final)
|-
|align=left|2018
|1st
| 3 || 3 || 0 || 0 ||118 || 31 ||  +87 || 3 || 0 ||15
| — ||align=left| Title winner on league table (no final)
|-
|align=left|2017
|1st
| 3 || 3 || 0 || 0 ||125 || 71 || +54  || 2 || 0 ||15
| — ||align=left| Title winner on league table (no final)
|-
|align=left|2016
|1st
| 3 || 3 || 0 || 0 ||134 || 34 || +100 || 3 || 0 ||15
| 36–0 ||align=left| Won final against 
|- 
|align=left|2015
|2nd
| 3 || 2 || 0 || 1 ||145 || 42 || +103 || 2 || 1 || 11
| 9–17 ||align=left| Lost final to Argentina's Pampas XV
|- 
|align=left|2014
| 3rd
| 3 || 2 || 0 || 1 ||154 || 59 ||  95 || 2 || 1 || 11
| — ||align=left| Won 3rd play-off 54–21 against 
|-
|align=left|2013
| 1st
| 6 || 2 || 2 || 2 || 118 || 155 || -37 || 2 || 0 || 14
| — ||align=left| Title winner on league table (no final)
|-
|align=left|2012
| 1st
| 8 || 7 || 0 || 1 ||205 || 165 || 40 || 3 || 0 || 31
| — ||align=left| Title winner on league table (no final)
|-
|align=left|2011
| 1st
| 8 || 4 || 0 || 4 || 144 || 201 || -57 || 0 || 1 || 17
| — ||align=left| Title winner on league table (no final)
|-
|align=left|2010
|1st
|5||4||0||1||155||73||+82||2 ||1 ||19
|||align=left| Won final against Fiji Barbarians
|-
|align=left|2009
|2nd
|5||3||0||2||168||89||+79||3 ||2 ||17
|19–7 ||align=left| Won final against Upolu Samoa
|-
|align=left|2008
|6th
|5||1||0||4||70||104||−34||0 ||3 ||7
| — ||align=left| Did not compete in finals
|-
|align=left|2007
|4th
|5||2||0||3||93||90||+3||0 ||1 ||11
| — ||align=left| Did not compete in finals
|-
|align=left|2006
|2nd
|5||3||1||1||112||72||+40||1 ||1 ||17
|5–10 ||align=left| Lost final to Savaii Samoa
|}

Americas Pacific Challenge
{| class="wikitable" style="text-align:center;"
|- border=1 cellpadding=5 cellspacing=0
! style="width:20px;"|Year
! style="width:20px;"|Pos
! style="width:20px;"|Pld
! style="width:20px;"|W
! style="width:20px;"|D
! style="width:20px;"|L
! style="width:20px;"|F
! style="width:20px;"|A
! style="width:35px;"|+/-
! style="width:20px;"|TB
! style="width:20px;"|LB
! style="width:20px;"|Pts
! style="width:50px;"|Final
! align=left|Notes 
|-
|align=left|2016
|2nd
| 3 || 2 || 0 || 1 || 127 || 65 || +62 || 4 || 0 || 12
| — ||align=left| Runner-up on league table (no final)
|}

International results

Matches against national teams or national 'A" teams since 2010 up to and including the 2015 tour to Uruguay: 
{|style= "table-layout:fixed; width=95%; margin-top:0;margin-left:0;  border-width:1px;border-style:none ;border-color:#ddd; padding:0px; vertical-align:top;" cellpadding=3
|-
 |16-04-2010 || (PS) ||align=right | Fiji A|| 12–27 ||  ||National Stadium, Suva
|-
 |23-04-2010 || (PS)||align=right | Fiji A|| 21–3 ||  ||Churchill Park, Lautoka
|-
 |19-03-2011 || (PRC) ||align=right | Fiji Warriors|| 21–14 ||  ||Churchill Park, Lautoka
|-
 |22-03-2011 || (PRC) ||align=right |  || 12–23 || Fiji Warriors ||Churchill Park, Lautoka
|-
 |13-08-2011 || (PS) ||align=right | Fiji A|| 27–12 ||  ||Churchill Park, Lautoka
|-
 |19-08-2011 || (PS) ||align=right | Fiji A|| 30–32 ||  ||Churchill Park, Lautoka
|-
 |15-10-2012 || (PRC) ||align=right | Fiji Warriors      || 42–34 ||  ||Teufaiva Stadium, Nuku'alofa
|-
 |19-10-2012 || (PRC) ||align=right |  || 16–25 || Fiji Warriors      ||Teufaiva Stadium, Nuku'alofa
|-
 |17-11-2012 || ||align=right |  || 53–0 || Fiji Warriors  ||Thomond Park, Limerick
|-
 |18-03-2014 || (PRC) ||align=right |  || 13–99 || Fiji Warriors ||Bond University, Gold Coast
|-
 |23-03-2014 || (PRC) ||align=right | Fiji Warriors      || 54–21 || 	||TG Milner Oval, Sydney
|-
 |10-03-2015 || (PRC) ||align=right | Fiji Warriors || 20–22 || Pampas XV ||National Stadium, Suva
|-
 |14-03-2015 || (PRC) ||align=right | Fiji Warriors || 83–0 ||  || National Stadium, Suva
|-
 |18-03-2015 || (PRC) ||align=right | Fiji Warriors || 42–20 ||  || National Stadium, Suva
|-
 |23-03-2015 || (PRC) ||align=right | Fiji Warriors || 9–17 || Pampas XV || National Stadium, Suva
|-
 |23-05-2015 || ||align=right |  || 22–30 || Fiji Warriors ||Estadio Charrúa, Montevideo
|-
 |27-05-2015 || ||align=right |  || 21–23 || Fiji Warriors ||Estadio Suppici, Colonia del Sacramento
|}

See also

 Fijian Drua
 Fiji national rugby union team

References

External links
2014 Pacific Rugby Cup News on oceaniarugby.com

2003 establishments in Fiji
Warriors
Second national rugby union teams